The 1997 FIVB Women's U20 World Championship was held in Gdynia, Poland from September 5 to 13, 1997. 16 teams participated in the tournament. This tournament had to be played at Gdynia, Poland.

Qualification process 

 * Germany replaced France.
 ** Czechia replaced Croatia.

Pools composition

Preliminary round

Pool A 

|}

Pool B 

|}

Pool C 

|}

Pool D 

|}

Second round

Play off – elimination group

Play off – seeding group

Final round

Quarterfinals

5th–8th semifinals

Semifinals

7th place

5th place

3rd place

Final

Final standing

External links 
 Informative website.

World Championship
Women's U20 Volleyball World Championship
FIVB Volleyball Women's U20 World Championship
FIVB Women's Junior World Championship
1997 in youth sport